Theodgar of Vestervig (also Dietger, Dioter, Theodgardus) (d. 24 June, in or about 1065) was a missionary from Thuringia who worked mostly in Jutland in Denmark, where he died and is venerated as a saint.

Theodgar studied theology in England, after which he travelled as a missionary to Norway, where King Olav II Haraldsson attached him to his court. After the king's death Theodgar left Norway and worked as a missionary on the Jutland peninsula in Denmark, where he died on 24 June in or around 1065. His remains were translated on 30 October 1117 to the church of the Augustinian Vestervig Abbey.

Sources 
 Nyberg, Tore, nd: Thøger (Theodgardus) in: Lexikon für Theologie und Kirche. 3rd edition, vol. 9, p. 1503 
 

German Roman Catholic missionaries
German Roman Catholic saints
Danish Roman Catholic saints
Clergy from Thuringia
People from Thisted Municipality
1060s deaths
11th-century Christian saints
Christian missionaries in Denmark
Christian missionaries in Norway
Year of birth unknown
Christianity in medieval Norway
Medieval Danish saints
11th-century German clergy
11th-century Danish clergy
11th-century Norwegian people